Edward Franklin Geers (January 25, 1851 – September 3, 1924), nicknamed "Pop", was an American harness racer and author of 'Ed Geers' experience with the Trotters and the Pacers.'

He was born on January 25, 1851, in Tennessee to William Gideon Geers and Emily Woolard. He died on September 3, 1924, in Wheeling, West Virginia.

References

External links
 
 
 Harness Racing Museum, Hall of Fame, Edward F. Geers

1851 births
1924 deaths
American harness racers